Kenneth Allen Ross (born January 21, 1936)  is a mathematician and an emeritus professor of mathematics at the University of Oregon. He served as an associate editor for Mathematics Magazine. He was president of the Mathematical Association of America from 1995 to 1996. He is a recipient of the Charles Y. Hu Award for distinguished service to mathematics.

Selected publications

Comfort, W. W.; Ross, Kenneth A. "Pseudocompactness and uniform continuity in topological groups", Pacific J. Math. 16 1966 483–496.
Ross, Kenneth A. Elementary Analysis: The Theory of Calculus, Springer-Verlag New York, 1980. Second edition, 2013, xi+409 pp.
Ken Ross, A Mathematician at the Ballpark: Odds and Probabilities for Baseball Fans, Pi Press New York, 2004, xv+189 pp. Second edition, Plume, Penquin Group, 2007, xv+206 pp.

López, Jorge M.; Ross, Kenneth A. Sidon sets, Lecture Notes in Pure and Applied Mathematics, Vol. 13. Marcel Dekker, Inc., New York, 1975. v+193 pp.

References

External links
 Ken Ross's homepage

University of Oregon faculty
20th-century American mathematicians
21st-century American mathematicians
Living people
Place of birth missing (living people)
1936 births
University of Washington alumni